Inka (Aymara and Quechua for Inca, Hispanicized spelling Inca) is a mountain in the Cordillera Real in the Bolivian Andes. It is situated in the La Paz Department, Sud Yungas Province, Yanacachi Municipality. Inka lies north-east of the mountain Mururata and south-east of the mountain Wanakuni.

References 

Mountains of La Paz Department (Bolivia)